Rokita is a surname. Notable people with the surname include:

Anna Rokita (born 1986), Austrian speed skater
Antoni Rokita (1909–1963), Polish wrestler
Jan Rokita (born 1959), Polish politician
Nelli Rokita (born 1957), Polish politician
Todd Rokita (born 1970), American congressman

See also

Rakita (disambiguation)

Polish-language surnames